Paano Kita Mapasasalamatan? may refer to:

 "Paano Kita Mapasasalamatan?", 1980 song written by George Canseco
 Paano Kita Mapasasalamatan?, a Philippine television program